Sofia Johansson  (born 5 September 1969) is a Swedish footballer who played as a midfielder for the Sweden women's national football team. She was part of the team at the 1995 FIFA Women's World Cup. On club level she played for Malmö in Sweden.

References

External links
 

1969 births
Living people
Swedish women's footballers
Sweden women's international footballers
Place of birth missing (living people)
1995 FIFA Women's World Cup players
Women's association football midfielders